UFC Fight Night: Hermansson vs. Strickland (also known as UFC Fight Night 200, UFC on ESPN+ 58 and UFC Vegas 47) was a mixed martial arts (MMA) event produced by the Ultimate Fighting Championship that took place on February 5, 2022 at the UFC Apex facility in Enterprise, Nevada, part of the Las Vegas Metropolitan Area, United States.

Background
A middleweight bout between Jack Hermansson and  Sean Strickland served as the event headliner.

A light heavyweight bout between Danilo Marques and Jailton Almeida was scheduled for UFC Fight Night: Holloway vs. Rodríguez. However, the bout was rescheduled due to Marques getting injured and it is now expected to take place at this event.

A flyweight bout between Malcolm Gordon and Denys Bondar was scheduled for UFC Fight Night: Vieira vs. Tate. However, Gordon withdrew from the event due to undisclosed reasons and the pairing was rescheduled for this date.

Ian Heinisch was expected to face Sam Alvey in a middleweight bout. Heinisch pulled out due to undisclosed reasons in late December and was replaced by Phil Hawes. In turn, Hawes withdrew from the bout during fight week due to an undisclosed injury and was replaced by Brendan Allen, with the bout being moved up to light heavyweight.

At the weigh-ins, Steven Peterson weighed in at 149 pounds, 3 pounds over the featherweight non-title fight limit. His bout proceeded at a catchweight and he was fined 30% of his purse, which went to his opponent Julian Erosa.

Results

Bonus awards
The following fighters received $50,000 bonuses.
 Fight of the Night: Julian Erosa vs. Steven Peterson
 Performance of the Night: Shavkat Rakhmonov and Chidi Njokuani

Aftermath
On April 19, it was reported that Miles Johns tested positive for adderall in a urine test collected at the day of the event. As a result, he was received a six-month suspension, along with a $3,450 fine, which amounts to 15 percent of his fight purse.

See also 

 List of UFC events
 List of current UFC fighters
 2022 in UFC

References 

UFC Fight Night
2022 in mixed martial arts
February 2022 sports events in the United States
2022 in sports in Nevada
Mixed martial arts in Las Vegas
Sports competitions in Las Vegas